The Lancia Theta (25/35 HP, type 61) is a car which was produced between 1913-1918 by Lancia. The car was a bigger version of the Epsilon model. The car had electrical lights and start motor.

 

Theta
Cars introduced in 1913
Brass Era vehicles